Locas de Amor  is an Argentine series, produced by Pol-ka Producciones which was originally transmitted from April to December 2004. It was written and adapted for television by Suzana Cardozo. It was directed by Luis Barone and Daniel Barone. It starred Leticia Brédice, Julieta Díaz and Soledad Villamil. 52 episodes were made.

The show tells the story of three young mental hospital inmates: Juana, Simona and María, and their attempts to reinsert themselves into society after being released from the psychiatric institution.

Cast
 Leticia Brédice… Simona Teglia 
 Julieta Díaz… Juana Vazquez 
 Soledad Villamil… Maria Eva Alchouron Doura 
 Diego Peretti… Martin Uribelarrea 
 Alfredo Casero… Roque Rizzutti 
 Andrea Pietra… Frida Maurer 
 Cristina Murta… Dra. Liliana Paredes 
 Christina Banegas… Regina Terrile 
 Leonor Manso… Olga Spinelli 
 Paula Siero… Paula Goci 
 Horacio Roca… Dr. Rafael Berthelot

Trivia
The theme music for the show was "Tu locura," by Gustavo Cerati. Cerati had composed an original piece simply named "Locura." Nevertheless, the artist chose to change songs at last moment. "Locura" was reworked, culminating in "Uno entre 1000" included in Cerati's Ahí vamos (2006). 
For the video of "Crimen", the first single for Ahí vamos, Cerati invited Julieta Díaz to play a dual role as secretary and femme fatale.

Remake 
In 2009 the company Televisa began to transmit the broadcast of the series remake Locas de amor under the same title block within the Series originales: Hecho en casa broadcast by Channel 5 in the production of Carmen Armendariz (Hora Marcada, Tony Tijuana) and headed by Francisco Franco with performances by Cecilia Suárez (Cappadocia, Mujeres asesinas), Diana Bracho (Fuego en la sangre), Cynthia Klitbo (El privilegio de amar) and Daniel Giménez Cacho (La mala educación), among others actors.

External links
 Locas de Amor minisite at Pol-Ka Productions
 

2000s Argentine television series
2004 telenovelas
2004 Argentine television series debuts
2004 Argentine television series endings
Argentine telenovelas
Spanish-language telenovelas
Pol-ka telenovelas